Epia casnonia is a moth in the family Bombycidae first described by Herbert Druce in 1887. It is found in Panama.

References

Bombycidae